Western Province (known for sponsorship reasons as DHL Western Province) is a South African professional rugby union team based in Newlands, Cape Town, that participates in the annual Currie Cup and Vodacom Cup tournaments. Founded in 1883, the team has won multiple titles, a record of 34 Currie Cup titles including the inaugural competition, the Vodacom Cup, the Absa Nite Series, and the Lion Cup. The club has the most supporters of any Currie Cup team.

The Club is nicknamed Die Streeptruie ("The Striped Jerseys" in Afrikaans) in reference to their legendary blue and white hooped jerseys. These Striped Jerseys were the colours of Malmesbury Rugby Football Club, established in 1881. They are also known simply as "Province" by all South African rugby lovers, while Afrikaans-speaking supporters also refer to the team by its abbreviation, W.P. (pronounced: "vee pee" ["ee" as in "beer"]).

Western Province were the 2012 Vodacom Cup Champions, having defeated the Griquas in 2012 by 20 points to 18. They also are the 2014 Currie cup champions, having defeated the Lions 19–16 in the final. Western Province is the only South African Team besides the Blue Bulls to have appeared in every final of every competition in South African rugby: the Vodacom Cup, the Lion Cup, the Absa Nite Series, the Currie Cup and the Super Rugby Competitions (as the DHL Stormers).

Another accomplishment of Western Province, which no South African team has ever been able to match, is the double victories over the All Blacks the first being (10–3) played on 15 August 1928 and again (12–11) on 16 July 1976, while several countries have never been able to beat the All Black team, Province managed this feat. In 2010 province again did a remarkable victory over all of New Zealand's five super unions, this was the first and only time such an accomplishment has been achieved. Province has also beaten the Wallabies 17–6 in a thrilling encounter in 1963. Province has also drawn to other countries including England in 1984 with a score of 15 all, however province has beaten the British and Irish Lions numerous times, including three times in 1903 and won another match in 1924, the match then had been regarded as "test" status. The only two teams to have beaten overseas countries as well as combination teams (Lions) are yet again the Blue Bulls and Western Province. Province was unstoppable by any other opposition in the 1980s except for Northern Transvaal. Among the ten Currie Cup trophies in the 1980s 5 went to Province 4 went to Northern Transvaal and 1 was shared, this shows the dominance between the two teams and the constant intense rivalry between the unions.

Since 1983 Western Province has been sponsored by Adidas, in 2013 this will mark the 30th Anniversary of the sponsorship and the 130th anniversary of the team itself. In 1983 Province launched their centenary jersey of which 50 only ever came into existence, but this is not the rarest province top, the rarest being a complete maroon kit of which only 15 were ever made, this team played under the WP Presidents XV. The maroon jersey along with the centenary jersey as well as the original Stormers orange tops are the three most sought after Province and or Stormers tops.

Team sponsor DHL has officially renewed their sponsorship with Western Province until 2016, following an emphatic 2012 season.

Western Province currently combines with Boland Cavaliers to compete as the DHL Stormers in the United Rugby Championship competition.

History
The club was established in 1883. The club claimed their first Currie Cup title in 1889; they repeated this success just three years later, winning the title again in 1892. Western Province continued to dominate the Currie Cup throughout the 1890s, winning the competition in 1894, 1895, 1897 and 1898. This success continued into the early 1900s, as they won in 1904, 1906 and 1908. The competition still being contested irregularly at this stage, was next won by the Western Province in 1914. They won a further seven times over the next two decades – four times in the 1920s and again three times in the 1930s, sharing two with Border. When the first Currie Cup championship was introduced in 1939, Western Province featured in the final, but lost to Transvaal 17–6 in Cape Town.

After losing the final in 1946 to Northern Transvaal, Western Province won their first final in 1947. The Currie Cup became an annual competition in 1969 and Western Province made it to the final that year, though they lost to Northern Transvaal. The team had to wait another seven seasons before making another final appearance, which they lost against the Orange Free State (recently renamed as the Free State Cheetahs) in Bloemfontein. Three years later they won the Currie Cup, sharing with Northern Transvaal at Newlands Stadium in Cape Town. The next year Province again lost in the final to Northern Transvaal. Northern Transvaal became Western Province's biggest rival during this time. During South Africa's sporting isolation (brought about as a result of the country's apartheid policy) this rivalry took centre stage and became the climax of the Currie Cup season. The teams met in another six championship finals until the 1990s. In the 1980s Western Province experienced what many described as their "golden years", winning the title outright for five years in a row. This feat is yet to be equaled. (Northern Transvaal had achieved this before but their third victory in the winning streak was shared with Western Province) After drawing 16 all with Northern Transvaal in the 1989 final, their next final appearance would be in 1995, when they were defeated by the Sharks in Durban. They won the Currie Cup in 1997, defeating the Free State Cheetahs, but the following season they lost to the Blue Bulls (Northern Transvaal).

Western Province won the championship twice in 2000 and 2001, defeating the Sharks on both occasions. 2010 saw the return of the club as they managed to make both the Super Rugby and Currie Cup finals losing on both occasions. After winning the Vodacom Cup and the Super Rugby Conference Cup, Western Province beat the Sharks in Durban to win the Currie Cup in 2012 as well. In 2013 the Province went unbeaten throughout the Currie Cup but lost in the Final. Western Province continued to dominate the Currie Cup by making the 3 finals in as many years and won the 2014 title beating the Lions in a tight fought match. In 2015 the club went on to win their 3rd and unprecedented Super Rugby Conference Cup in 5 years. In the recent times and in terms of competitions won on all levels, Western Province has been the most successful Rugby Union in South Africa over the period 2011-2015.

Team sponsors 

1988–1998 Norwich
1999–2002 Fedsure
2003–2005 Investec
2006–2010 Vodacom
2011–present DHL

Clothing sponsors 

1970–1982 Maxmore
1983–2017 Adidas
2018 Genuine Connection

Name 

The name of the club comes simply from the province they represent. In the 1990s many teams changed their names as a result of pressure by the new ANC government. Previously many teams were named after the provinces they were based in and seeing as these provinces no longer existed, the names were no longer valid. Some teams simply added some form of animal or mascot name (e.g. Boland became the Boland Cavaliers) whereas others had to change their entire name. Transvaal for example had to change their name to the Golden Lions. Northern Transvaal were also renamed the Blue Bulls although this was less of a problem for their supporters as this had been the team's nickname for many years. Western Province is the only union that has never changed its name or added anything to it.

Stadium

Newlands Stadium

Until 2021, the Western Province Rugby Football Union was based at Newlands Stadium. Newlands is commonly referred to as the home of South African rugby. The first official matches played at Newlands were in 1890. The ground has been continually developed over the past century, entirely due to the efforts of the Western Province Rugby Football Union and its administrators. Since the advent of professional rugby, the stadium has taken on various names due to sponsorship of the Western Province side, but is today simply named Newlands, a decision made by former sponsors Investec. Vodacom has since taken over sponsorship of the team and stadium, but chose not to rename the stadium. This decision proved very popular among the faithful supporters who deeply respect the traditions associated with W.P. rugby and Newlands itself. Newlands normally draws the largest average crowds of any stadium in the Super Rugby competition. In 2002 the Stormers welcomed their millionth spectator through the gates. The ground was bought in 1888, and currently has a capacity of 50,900. Currently Western Province have the highest supporter bases in South Africa, with the Stormers averaging crowds of 45,000 at home Super rugby games and Western Province averaging crowds of 31,000 in the Currie Cup competition. Western Province continued to have the largest crowd attendance of all the local and international Super Rugby Teams.

Cape Town Stadium

The Western Province Rugby Football Union is currently based at Cape Town Stadium.

Honours

Board Trophy (1): 1889

Currie Cup (34) (4 Shared): 1892, 1894, 1895, 1897, 1898, 1904, 1906, 1908, 1914, 1920, 1925, 1927, 1929, 1932 (shared), 1934 (shared), 1936, 1947, 1954, 1959, 1964, 1966, 1979 (shared), 1982, 1983, 1984, 1985, 1986, 1989 (shared), 1997, 2000, 2001, 2012, 2014, 2017

Lion Cup (3) 1984, 1988, 1989

Currie Cup / Central Series Percy Frames Trophy (1) 1986

SuperSport Rugby Challenge (1) 2017

Vodacom Cup (1) 2012

Bankfin Nite Series (1) 1997

Glasgow Academicals Sevens (1) 1993

Current squad

The following players were included in the Western Province squad for the 2023 Currie Cup Premier Division:

Finals results

Currie Cup

Notes

1 Transvaal are now known as the Golden Lions.
2 Contested over two seasons.
3 Orange Free State were renamed the Free State Cheetahs.
4 Northern Transvaal were renamed the Blue Bulls.

References

External links
 

South African rugby union teams
Sport in Cape Town
Rugby clubs established in 1883